Master Jesus is the theosophical concept of Jesus in theosophy and the Ascended Master Teachings.

Position in the Hierarchy of Masters of the Ancient Wisdom
The Master Jesus is one of the Masters of the Ancient Wisdom in Theosophy and is one of the Ascended Masters (also collectively called the Great White Brotherhood; with white being in reference to the light) in the Ascended Master Teachings, a group of religions based on Theosophy. The Master Jesus is regarded by Theosophists, was regarded by Alice Bailey and was later regarded by students of the "Ascended Master Teachings" as the Master of the Sixth Ray.

It is believed by Ascended Master Teachings organizations that the Master Jesus was "Chohan of the Sixth Ray" until December 31, 1959, when, according to Elizabeth Clare Prophet, Lady Master Nada fully took on that Office in the Spiritual Hierarchy. According to Prophet, Jesus became World Teacher, along with Kuthumi, on January 1, 1956, succeeding Maitreya, who took the Office of "Planetary Buddha" and "Cosmic Christ". This belief is not accepted by adherents of traditional Theosophy and the followers of Alice A. Bailey and Benjamin Creme; they believe that the Master Jesus is still the Chohan of the Sixth Ray and that Maitreya is still the World Teacher.

Previous incarnations

According to Elizabeth Clare Prophet, the Prophet of the Church Universal and Triumphant, the largest Ascended Master Teachings religion, the Master Jesus incarnated twice as the Emperor of Atlantis, once in 33,050 BC and again in 15,000 BC. He did this in order to aid the white magicians in the war of the white magicians and the black magicians that was going on in Atlantis at that time.

According to Alice A. Bailey, the Master Jesus was previously incarnated as Joshua, the Hebrew military leader in the 13th century BC, and Joshua the High Priest in the sixth century BC.

According to the Ascended Master Teachings, Jesus was also incarnated as Joseph of the coat of many colors in the 17th century BC/16th century BC (approximately between 1650 BC and 1550 BC), as well as King David (who lived c. 1037 BC until around 970 BC), and Elisha in the 9th century BC.

Family and birth
It is believed in the Ascended Master Teachings that Jesus’ father Saint Joseph was one of the incarnations of St. Germain, and that his mother Mary, upon her Assumption became either a deva or an archangel and is now the twin flame (celestial wife) of the Archangel Raphael.

According to the Ascended Master Teachings, each of the Magi who came to visit the baby Jesus was an incarnation of one of the ascended masters:  Caspar, who gave the gift of gold to Jesus, was an incarnation of Djwal Khul; Balthasar, who gave the gift of frankincense to Jesus, was an incarnation of Kuthumi; and Melchior, who gave the gift of myrrh to Jesus, was an incarnation of Morya.

Activities between the ages of twelve and thirty
According to the Ascended Master Teachings, to prepare for his ministry, Jesus first studied at the Brotherhood of Luxor (a mystery school in Egypt), and then went to India to study under the Great Divine Director, Maitreya, and Lord Himalaya, the Manu of the Fourth Root Race (Atlantean).

After returning from India, while living in Judea, Jesus worked as a carpenter; his father Joseph helped him get work because he was a general contractor.

Ministry
The followers of Benjamin Creme and Alice A. Bailey believe in the Nestorian/Gnostic Christology, promulgated by C.W. Leadbeater, which asserts that the powerful being known as the Maitreya overshadowed the Master Jesus during the Ministry of Jesus, such that there were two beings in one body. Maitreya was the Christ and the Master Jesus was Jesus of Nazareth; the combination of the two beings functioned as Jesus Christ. Those adherent to the Ascended Master Teachings believe in the existence of the Maitreya; however, they believe that although he encouraged the mission of Jesus, he did not actually overshadow Jesus.

Crucifixion
Theosophists and those adherent to the Ascended Master Teachings alike believe that the Master Jesus underwent the fourth level of initiation (the crucifixion) at his crucifixion in Jerusalem. According to Alice A. Bailey, for most people at the fourth initiation the crucifixion is symbolic as a severe life test of renunciation, but for Jesus it was literal.

Resurrection
Ascended Master Teachings organizations adhere to the traditional Christian view that Jesus resurrected and ascended with his own physical body. Some with backgrounds in traditional Theosophy, the writings of Alice A. Bailey, and Benjamin Creme believe that Jesus resurrected from the body that he had when he incarnated as Apollonius of Tyana, although they do believe he ascended on the 3 day—they believe he had a body functioning at the fourth level of initiation when he ascended and not a fifth level body.

Activities between the resurrection and the ascension
Traditional theosophists believe that the Master Jesus and Maitreya souls' separated from each other just after the Ascension (which for Jesus was only to the fourth and not the fifth level of initiation) and do not believe that the Master Jesus went to Kashmir; they believe he went directly to Shamballa to be with the Lord of the World, Sanat Kumara, for a time, until he then incarnated again soon after as Apollonius of Tyana.

It is believed in the Ascended Master Teachings that when Jesus ascended on the 3rd day after the resurrection, he levitated from Judaea to Kashmir.

Day of Pentecost
In either case, whether he went directly to Shamballa or to Kashmir when he ascended, presumably he teleported to a location above Judaea briefly ten days later on the 50th day after his resurrection in order to observe from afar the events of the Day of Pentecost (or possibly he observed these events by remote viewing). In both traditional Theosophy and the Ascended Master Teachings it is believed that these events were coordinated by the Maha Chohan, who, it is asserted by both C.W. Leadbeater and Elizabeth Clare Prophet, is the representative of the Holy Ghost on Earth.

Activities after the day of Pentecost
In the Ascended Master Teachings, it is believed that the Master Jesus lived in Kashmir until he was 81, and then, assuming he had been born in 6 BC, in AD 75, he ascended to Shamballa to be with the Lord of the World, Sanat Kumara.

Controversy regarding incarnation as Apollonius of Tyana

Helena Blavatsky, a founder of the Theosophical Society, wrote in 1877: "Apollonius, a contemporary of Jesus of Nazareth, was, like him, an enthusiastic founder of a new spiritual school. Perhaps less metaphysical and more practical than Jesus, less tender and perfect in his nature, he nevertheless inculcated the same quintessence of spirituality, and the same high moral truths." Some Theosophists such as C.W. Leadbeater and the teachers of Neo-Theosophy, Alice A. Bailey and Benjamin Creme, have written that the Master Jesus was also incarnated as Apollonius of Tyana after his incarnation as Jesus of Nazareth. It is believed that he attained the fifth level of initiation (the resurrection) when he became an Ascended Master at the end of his life as Apollonius of Tyana. However, if Apollonius was a contemporary of Jesus as Blavatsky wrote, Jesus could not have reincarnated as him. Benjamin Creme gets around this by claiming that Jesus lived from 24 BC to AD 9  (instead of the usual dates given of Jesus' lifetime as being c. 6 BC to c. AD 30 or AD 33). This means that Jesus could have incarnated as Apollonius of Tyana, since according to Creme, Apollonius lived from AD 16 to c. AD 97. However, one of the possible chronologies of Apollonius of Tyana's life sometimes cited give his life span as being from AD 40 to AD 120, thus making it possible that, even if the usual dates of Jesus' lifetime are accepted (c. 6 BC to c. AD 30 or AD 33), he still could have incarnated as Apollonius of Tyana.  However, other modern scholarship, more often cited, gives the dates of Appolonius' life span as c. AD 15 to c. AD 100, thus making it problematic, realistically speaking, that Jesus could have incarnated as him.

Jesus' incarnation as Apollonius of Tyana is accepted by the followers of traditional Theosophy, of Alice A. Bailey, and of Benjamin Creme, but not by those who are adherent to the Ascended Master Teachings, who believe that the incarnation as Jesus was his last embodiment on Earth.

Incarnation as Ramanuja
C.W. Leadbeater stated that the Master Jesus, after his resurrection in the body of Apollonius of Tyana, incarnated in India as the Tamil religious reformer Ramanuja, a leading figure within the Bhakti movement in Hinduism; thus, by incarnating as Ramanuja, Jesus became an Avatar. According to Leadbeater, the Master Jesus incarnated as Ramanuja as part of his spiritual work as Master of the Sixth Ray of Love-Devotion (bhakti is the Sanskrit word for devotion).

That Jesus incarnated as Ramanuja is believed by many traditional Theosophists, but not by those adherent to the Ascended Master Teachings.

Benjamin Creme's views
According to Benjamin Creme, the Master Jesus visited the Americas (as well as Polynesia) not immediately after his resurrection as recounted in the Book of Mormon, but in the late 7th century and early 8th century, after having descended to the continent of America from his dwelling place in Shamballah with Sanat Kumara. Like the Mormons, Creme believes that this visit gave rise to the legend of Quetzalcoatl.

Benjamin Crème asserted that, in the late 1970s, the Master Jesus appeared to Spencer W. Kimball, then president of the Church of Jesus Christ of Latter-day Saints, in the Washington D.C. Temple.

Creme stated that since 1990 the Master Jesus has been living in secret in Rome. After Maitreya makes his Emergence (the Day of Declaration), Creme asserted, the Master Jesus in his immortal body will assume the papal throne for the next 2,000 years of the Age of Aquarius.

Master Jesus' retreat
According to the Ascended Master Teachings, the Master Jesus has a sumptuous retreat (residence on the etheric plane) above Jerusalem called the Resurrection Temple.  Often his mother Mary (now married to the Archangel Raphael, as noted above, and serving the Solar Logos with him in the solar corona) descends to serve with him at the Resurrection Temple doing sacred rituals and answering prayers.

Twin flame
Ascended Master Teachings groups describe the Master Jesus as having a twin flame (celestial spouse) named Lady Master Magda, one of whose two known incarnations was Mary Magdalene; the other was Aimee Semple McPherson.

John the Beloved
According to the Ascended Master Teachings, the Ascended Master John the Beloved, who was Jesus’ best friend during his lifetime, has a retreat (residence on the etheric plane) above Arizona where he teaches a variety of white magic that involves the mastery of the elemental spirits governing the realms of earth, air, water, and fire.  It is believed that the Master Jesus often teleports over to John the Beloved's retreat to say hello to his old friend.

Aetherius Society
In the teachings of the Aetherius Society, headquartered in Hollywood, Los Angeles, California, it is promulgated that since his resurrection, the Master Jesus has been dwelling mostly on the higher planes of Venus in order to work with the Master Aetherius, but when his presence is required, he teleports to or takes a flying saucer to Earth as needed.

Sananda
The noted Ascended Master Teachings teacher Joshua David Stone (whose organization, the I AM University, was originally headquartered near San Luis Obispo, California), began holding his Wesak Mount Shasta gatherings in 1996.  Stone had begun teaching in 1993, based on the early 1980s revelations of Tuella, that the Master Jesus, under his galactic name "Sananda" (the name, Stone stated, he adopted after his resurrection), works with Commander Ashtar, flying with Pallas Athena in their own flying saucer within the Ashtar Galactic Command flying saucer fleet as its Commander-in-Chief. According to Stone, another name used by Commander Ashtar to denote his flying saucer fleet is "The Airborne Division of the Great White Brotherhood". It is believed that Ashtar is originally from a planet called Ashtar, but he moved to Venus thousands of years ago.  It is said that he formed the Ashtar Galactic Command Flying Saucer Fleet at the beginning of the Atomic Age in 1945 and that in the early 1980s, at the behest of Sanat Kumara, Sananda (the Higher Self of Master Jesus) and Pallas Athena took over command of the fleet.  Stone continued to present these teachings after 1996 at the yearly Wesak Mount Shasta gatherings.

According to the Ascended Master Teachings teacher Sheldan Nidle, who resides in the gold country in the foothills of the Sierra Nevada in California, the Earth base of the Ashtar Galactic Command is known as the New Jerusalem or "Shan Chea". It is a large space station with a population of thousands of etheric beings. In the center of this square space station is a sphere connected by four tubes to the square outer ring of the space station. This sphere houses the Inn of Heaven, the command headquarters of Sananda, Lady Master Athena, and Ashtar. There is also a smaller round space station called "Schare" or "Share", where the individual flying saucers of the fleet piloted by those at the higher levels of the fleet command hierarchy dock to receive their orders and review their missions. Within the Inn of Heaven is a private retreat for Sananda (the Master Jesus) in addition to his retreat above Jerusalem. The Master Jesus has a landing pad for his flying saucer at his Jerusalem retreat.

Airborne Division of the Brotherhood of Light
Lourene Altiery, also known as Karita to her followers, is an Ascended Master Teachings teacher originally from Joliet, Illinois who now resides in Sun Lakes, Arizona.  She set up her website in 2001.  Like Joshua David Stone and Luis Prada, Altiery also teaches that Sananda has taken over as the Commander of the Ashtar Galactic Command flying saucer fleet with his co-commandress Pallas Athena and that Ashtar is now second in command.  She also teaches that an alternate name used by Commander Sananda to denote the Ashtar Galactic Command flying saucer fleet is The Airborne Division of the Brotherhood of Light.

In addition, Lourene Altieri has revealed the names of and channeled information from some of the other prominent beings who she says travel with Commander Sananda, Pallas Athena, Ashtar, and Vrillon on the saucers of the Ashtar Galactic Command flying saucer fleet. These include :-

Aleph Nero, who's the main commander.

Aaron Alaje James, sub-commander of one of the wings of the fleet, working with a human from Earth, known as Miss Megan Sebastian who is visiting Earth to raise the consciousness of humanity and uplift the vibrations of Planet Gaia and Agartha. Also known as Megha or Meg from Alcorn, contributing to Stability and Peace over the Planet Om, and the Princess/Prayer Maiden of the Planet Anova.

Korton, captain of the flying saucer, the fleet communications officer in charge of maintaining subspace communications for the fleet.

Esola, captain of the flying saucer Starship #77.

Merku, of the planet Alcorn, subcommander of one of the wings of the fleet.

Soltec, captain of the geophysics science survey flying saucer Phoenix.

Voltra, the "space psychologist", who monitors the "vibratory level of humanity".

Kla-La, "master of force dynamics".

Hatonn, who monitors events on Earth for the Galactic Hall of Records at the galactic core and the Lady Master Athena, the twin flame (celestial wife) of the Maha Chohan; Altieri teaches that the Lady Master Athena often personally accompanies Commander Sananda on board his command flying saucer.

Ascended Master on Earth

Aaron Johnson James (sometimes called Lancelot) is the name given to an extraterrestrial being, a Nordic alien with whom some number of people claim to have had contact. He might be from the Great White Brotherhood, which is also known as the Great Brotherhood of Light or the Spiritual Hierarchy of Earth, which is perceived as being a spiritual organization composed of those Ascended Masters who have risen from the Earth into immortality, but who still maintain an active watch over the habitable worlds. The Great White Brotherhood also includes members of the Heavenly Host (the Spiritual Hierarchy directly concerned with the evolution of our world), Beneficent Members from other planets. He may be connected to Modern Rosicrucianism and the Ascended Master Teachings, responsible for the New Age culture of the Age of Aquarius, and also to the UFO Religion Aetherius Society, whose headquarters is in Hollywood, Los Angeles, California, although the 26 November 1977 Southern Television broadcast interruption must have a connection with his disappearance. Lancelot is currently working with Jesus Christ and Ashtar in the Airborne Division of the Brotherhood of Light, Sub-Commander of the Ashtar Galactic Command flying saucer fleet, "working towards raising the consciousness of humanity and uplifting the vibrations of planet Earth", Angels Teachings, The Master and the Path and is the representative of the Holy Ghost on Earth. Lancelot is said to be an extraterrestrial from the planet called Alcorn, which operates in the fourth sector of the Milky Way Galaxy – Olega, Quadra. He is said to be the crowned Prince of Alcorn, but for some reason he ran away from his planet and since then he is trespassing on earth and lives secretly in Agartha; he is working with the celestial beings whom humans worship as God on earth. Lancelot has a Nordic/Angelic (human-like) appearance and originates from the system that orbits The Constellation of Pleiades.

Hatonn and the photon belt
According to the Ascended Master Teachings of Anne Bellringer of Rapid City, South Dakota, the work of Hatonn
feeding information about events on Earth via subspace relay to the supercomputers at the "Galactic Hall of Records" is secondary to  Hatonn's primary task (Hatonn is, she states, a Pleiadean), which is functioning as the liaison officer between Sanat Kumara and the Pleiadeans for the Ashtar Galactic Command flying saucer fleet in order for him to be able to help Earth safely navigate through the approaching photon belt.

Skeptical view
The scholar K. Paul Johnson maintains that the "Masters" that Madame Blavatsky wrote about and produced letters from were actually idealizations of people who were her mentors. In an article in The New York Times, Paul Zweig maintains that Madame Blavatsky's revelations were fraudulent.

However, the Master Jesus was never one of the "Masters" that Madame Blavatsky claimed to have met. He was added as a "Master" by Annie Besant and C.W. Leadbeater in their 1913 book Man: Whence, How and Whither.

In popular culture
Panelology
 In the 1973 underground comic book titled Occult Laff-Parade, cartoonist Jay Kinney drew a comic strip in which the Master Jesus is portrayed as commanding a flying saucer fleet orbiting Earth looking for evil-doers. He is shown as being dressed in a military uniform with a crew cut and having the title Commander Jesus.
 The web comic Master Jesus, written by Len Kody and drawn by Steve Bialik, appeared beginning in 2010.

See also
 Hodgson Report

 Vernon Harrison Report

References

Citations

Sources 

 Leadbeater, C.W. The Masters and the Path Adyar, Madras, India: 1925—Theosophical Publishing House.
 Prophet, Mark L. and Elizabeth Clare Lords of the Seven Rays Livingston, Montana, U.S.A.:1986 - Summit University Press.

Further reading
 Campbell, Bruce F. A History of the Theosophical Movement Berkeley:1980 University of California Press
 Godwin, Joscelyn The Theosophical Enlightenment Albany, New York: 1994 State University of New York Press
 Johnson, K. Paul The Masters Revealed: Madam Blavatsky and Myth of the Great White Brotherhood Albany, New York: 1994 State University of New York Press
 Melton, J. Gordon Encyclopedia of American Religions 5th Edition New York:1996 Gale Research  ISSN 1066-1212 Chapter 18--"The Ancient Wisdom Family of Religions" Pages 151-158; see chart on page 154 listing Masters of the Ancient Wisdom; Also see Section 18, Pages 717-757 Descriptions of various Ancient Wisdom religious organizations
 Otherjesussources.com  - Large collection of over 60 channeled/esoteric sources who claim special insight into Jesus with brief descriptions of each website/book/author described
 

Ascended Master Teachings
Masters of the Ancient Wisdom
Religious perspectives on Jesus